Desert de les Palmes, also known as Serra del Desert de les Palmes is an 18.8 km long mountain range in the Plana Alta comarca, Valencian Community, Spain. Its highest point is Bartolo (729 m).

The Ermita de La Magdalena , an important church for Castellonenc people, is located on a hill at the southern end of the range. The Prime Meridian crosses the Desert de les Palmes roughly in the middle.

The Columbretes Islands can be seen on clear days in the horizon looking seaward from the Desert de les Palmes heights.

Origin of the name
Desert, the name of the range, originated in an ancient eremitical settlement or hermitage, known in Catalan as Desert, that was located in the mountain range.

Palmes on the other hand refers to the abundance of Chamaerops humilis palms in the range. Short, stocky, and growing in clumps, Chamaerops humilis is the only palm endemic to Europe.

Location
The Desert de les Palmes stretches in a NE - SW direction in the municipal terms of Benicàssim, Cabanes, La Pobla Tornesa, Borriol and Castelló de la Plana. It is located near the Mediterranean coastline, crossed by the highway between Barcelona and Valencia.

This mountain range has two ridges covered mostly with Maquis shrubland and low Mediterranean forest. There were two serious forest fires in 1985 and 1992.

Some of the peaks of the Desert de les Palmes are more jagged than the summits of other mountain ranges in the same system, like Serra d'Irta or Talaies d'Alcalà. 
The castles of Montornés and Miravet date back to Moorish times and the Ermita de les Santes church was built in 1617. There are two ridges in the range, the Desert de les Palmes and the Serra de les Santes, the latter named after the Ermita de les Santes. The mountain range was declared a Nature Reserve by the Generalitat Valenciana in 1989 with the name Parc Natural del Desert de les Palmes.

Geology
The Desert de les Palmes is located in the transition area between the Mediterranean System and the Iberian System that formed 25 million years ago as part of the Alpine orogeny.

Both the Desert de les Palmes and the Serra de les Santes are part of an anticline of paleozoic materials. Slate, as well as red triassic and grey jurassic and cretaceous rocks give the exposed areas of this mountain range striking colors.

See also
Mountains of the Valencian Community

References

External links

Desert de les Palmes Nature Reserve 
Pàgina dels parcs naturals del País Valencià 

Mountain ranges of the Valencian Community
Plana Alta